Behind the Music is the third album by the Swedish rock band The Soundtrack of Our Lives. It was originally released in Europe in February 2001, and subsequently around the world over the next two years. The album was the band's breakthrough record outside of their native Sweden, and was nominated for the Best Alternative Album award at the 2003 Grammy Awards. Among their newly found fans was Noel Gallagher, who proclaimed Behind the Music to be "the best album to come out in the last six years" and invited The Soundtrack of Our Lives to join on Oasis's UK and European tour in 2002.

The front cover features alginate masks of the faces of the six band members, cast by Swedish artists Per Svensson and Anna Strid. Svensson and the group's frontman Ebbot Lundberg had previously collaborated in an experimental sound and art project called 'Audio Laboratory'.

Track listing

Bonus Future Excerpts EP
 "We're Gonna Get It Right" – 4:01
 "Can't Control Myself" – 3:18
 "Slow Drift Away" – 2:51
 "Hang Ten" – 4:37
 "We'll Get By" – 1:59

This special limited edition bonus EP came bundled with the original release, and later appeared with special tour editions of the album in some territories. All five tracks of the EP also appeared on A Present from the Past.

Personnel
Mattias Bärjed – guitar, backing vocals, slide echoes and "additional instruments that makes us too pretentious to mention"
Åke Karl Kalle Gustafsson – bass, backing vocals, double bass violin and cembalo
Martin Hederos – piano, Mellotron, organ, backing vocals and string arrangement
Ebbot Lundberg – lead vocals, sitar, harmonica and dulcimer
Ian Person – guitar, backing vocals, percussion, Spanish sound effects and space slide
Fredrik Sandsten – drums, percussion and spiritual guidance

Additional personnel
Arpad Carlesäter – handclaps on "Independent Luxury"
Eva-Tea Lundberg – horns
Martin Wingate, John Löfgren, Märja Tokkola, Sigvard Järrebring and Kajsa Ivars – string quintet
Salmaan Rasa – tablas on "Can't Control Myself"

References

External links
Official site
Official US site
VH1 artist site
MTV artist site

2001 albums
The Soundtrack of Our Lives albums